Guajataca River is a river in Lares, Puerto Rico. It is located on the northwest coast of the island. It flows from the south and drains into the Atlantic Ocean. The name was given by the original Taino inhabitants prior to the arrival of Christopher Columbus.

It crosses the municipalities of Lares, San Sebastián, Quebradillas, and Isabela forming Guajataca Lake on its path.

The river also gives name to one of the principal lodgings in the area, Parador Guajataca. Guajataca, sometimes spelled Guajataka, is also the name of an area in the municipality of San Sebastián.

The river also carries the name and the subsequent reservoir, Lago Guajataca, built by the United States Army Corps of Engineers with a dam owned by the Puerto Rico Electrical Authority.

Many schools, businesses, and organizations, including a parador, Guajataka Scout Reservation, and kayak excursion company are named for the area as well.

Gallery

See also
 List of rivers of Puerto Rico

References

External links

 USGS Hydrologic Unit Map – Caribbean Region (1974)
 Lagos y plantas hidroeléctricas de Puerto Rico - Puerto Rico Lakes and Hidro-Electric Plants
 Guajataca Photos

Rivers of Puerto Rico
Isabela, Puerto Rico